Streptomyces camponoticapitis is a bacterium species from the genus of Streptomyces which has been isolated from the head of the ant Camponotus japonicus in Harbin in China.

See also 
 List of Streptomyces species

References 

 

camponoticapitis
Bacteria described in 2016